Lin Xiling (1935–2009), original name is Cheng Haiguo, born in Shanghai, was a Chinese activist and dissident. Her father was a linguist at Beijing University who later went to Taiwan. In 1949, Lin was enlisted in PLA as a secretary in Wenling, Zhejiang. In 1953, she went to Renmin University. In the case of Hu Feng, she defended Hu and was later implicated by this.

1935 births
2009 deaths
20th-century Chinese people
Chinese activists
Chinese dissidents
Victims of the Anti-Rightist Campaign
Chinese emigrants to France
Burials at Père Lachaise Cemetery
Renmin University of China alumni
People from Shanghai